Luiz Paulo Hilário, most commonly known as Dodô (born 16 October 1987) is a Brazilian professional footballer who plays as a left winger or attacking midfielder for FK Liepāja.

Career
Dodô was born in Rio de Janeiro. He signed for Inter Zaprešić in January 2009, on recommendation by Eduardo da Silva, another football player from Rio de Janeiro who played for Inter Zaprešić earlier in his career.

Dodô came to the club during the winter break of the 2008–09 season and since then he scored five goals in 13 league appearances for the Croatian club, including a hat-trick against Rijeka on the final day of the season, on 31 May 2009.

After scoring another four goals in the first half of the 2009–10 season, bring his total to nine goals in 30 games for Inter, Dodô was signed by Croatian giants GNK Dinamo Zagreb. In total he spent 12 months at Dinamo, scoring three times in 20 appearances. He was loaned out to NK Lokomotiva Zagreb for the second half of the 2010–11 season, where he scored twice in 12 appearances.

Gabala
In the summer of 2011, Dodô signed a two-year contract with Azerbaijan Premier League side Gabala FC, taking the number 77 jersey.

Dodô made his debut in the first game of the season against Baku in a 0–0 draw on 7 August 2011. His first goal for Gabala came in the fifth minute of his second game for the club away to Sumgayit in a game that finished in a 2–1 victory to Gabala. He ended his first season in Gabala with ten goals in all competitions. Following the departure of Deon Burton, Dodô took the number 10 jersey for his second season with Gabala, which saw him score four times in 33 appearances in all competitions to leave him in fifth place in Gabala's all time goal scorers chart with 14 goals.

During Gabala's 2–1 victory over Simurq on 13 September 2014, Dodô scored Gabala's 400th goal. Dodô scored a brace against Superleague Greece side Panathinaikos, knocking them out of the 2015–16 UEFA Europa League at the final qualifying stage on away goals, with the tie finish 2–2 on aggregate. 
On 4 October 2015, during Gabala's 6–0 victory over Khazar Lankaran, Dodô scored the fastest ever Azerbaijan Premier League at eight seconds.

On 3 December 2015, Dodô made his 150th appearance for Gabala, playing in the first half of their 7–0 victory over Mil-Muğan in the Azerbaijan Cup.

At the end of 2015–16 season, Dodo left Gabala.

AE Larissa
On 12 August 2016, AEL announced the signing of Dodo on a two-year contract. On 1 October 2016, he scored his first goal in a 1–1 away win against Levadiakos.

FK Liepāja
Dodô joined Latvian club FK Liepāja in January 2019.

Career statistics

References

External links
Dodô at FK Liepāja

1987 births
Living people
Brazilian footballers
Brazilian expatriate footballers
Association football forwards
NK Inter Zaprešić players
GNK Dinamo Zagreb players
NK Lokomotiva Zagreb players
Croatian Football League players
Gabala FC players
Joinville Esporte Clube players
FK Liepāja players
Latvian Higher League players
Campeonato Brasileiro Série B players
Azerbaijan Premier League players
Expatriate footballers in Azerbaijan
Expatriate footballers in Croatia
Expatriate footballers in Greece
Expatriate footballers in Latvia
Brazilian expatriate sportspeople in Azerbaijan
Brazilian expatriate sportspeople in Croatia
Brazilian expatriate sportspeople in Greece
Brazilian expatriate sportspeople in Latvia
Footballers from Rio de Janeiro (city)